Donald Ray Pettinger (born December 21, 1961, in Lamar, Colorado) is an American jockey in Thoroughbred flat horse racing.

He is the winner of a number of stakes races, including the 1989 Arlington Classic at Chicago's Arlington Park and the 2002 Valley View Stakes and the 2003 WinStar Galaxy Stakes at Keeneland Race Course.

In 2011, Donald Pettinger was inducted into the Oklahoma Horse Racing Hall of Fame.

References

1961 births
Living people
People from Lamar, Colorado
American jockeys